Ryan Rajendra Black (born June 10, 1973, in Winnipeg, Manitoba) is a Canadian actor, most noted for his leading role as Silas Crow in the 1994 film Dance Me Outside and its spinoff television series The Rez.

Career 
A Saulteaux member of the Sagkeeng First Nation, he has also appeared in the television series North of 60, Highlander: The Raven, Moccasin Flats and Cashing In, the films Cowboys and Indians: The J.J. Harper Story, Elimination Dance, Seven Times Lucky and Stryker, and on stage in a production of Ian Ross's theatrical play fareWel.

He received a Gemini Award nomination for Best Actor in a Drama Series at the 13th Gemini Awards in 1998. 

Black was a production coordinator for I, Hostage and I, Alive. He was also the second assistant director for 26 episodes of the 2019 reality series My Misdiagnosis.

Filmography

Film

Television

References

External links

1973 births
20th-century Canadian male actors
21st-century Canadian male actors
Canadian male television actors
Canadian male film actors
Canadian male stage actors
First Nations male actors
Male actors from Winnipeg
Saulteaux people
Living people